The Canadian International School in Tokyo (CIS, カナディアン・インターナショナル・スクール) is a Canadian curriculum international school in  Shinagawa, and Nakameguro, Meguro Tokyo.

CIS was founded in 2000 with 50 students, with the expansion of the Naka-Meguro campus for the kindergarten and elementary schools, and has grown to its current student population of over 500. CIS is accredited by the Department of Education of the Canadian province of Prince Edward Island (PEI) whose curriculum is used throughout the school. CIS offers pre-Kindergarten to grade 12, with students graduating and going on to attend universities in Canada, the United States and Japan, as well as countries in Europe. Just under 35% of CIS students are Japanese, with 30%  coming from Korea, and the remainder from Denmark, France, Germany, Italy, China, Brazil, South Africa, Saudi Arabia, Canada, Kuwait, and more.

CIS provides curriculum enrichment and enhancement by way of the International Baccalaureate program in kindergarten to grade 5; and Advanced Placement readiness and courses in grades 9 to 12. There are up to 8 Advanced Placement courses available in the high school section. In addition to a full academic program, the curriculum includes music, PE, art and Japanese language at all grade levels. These are taught at all levels by specialist teachers, with the exception of Japanese beginning in the first grade. CIS provides English language support for students whose English language skills are just below grade level. Students are however required to be within reach of Canadian grade level English language expectations with the support provided.

Teachers are a mixture of Canadian, Australian, American and British. All teachers regardless of nationality are required to hold professional teacher certification from Canada. This includes extensive background checks and academic background confirmation by ministries of education in Canada.

In addition to PEI accreditation, CIS is accredited by the Western Association of Schools and Colleges (WASC), the International Baccalaureate Organization (IBO), and is a member of the Japan Council of International Schools and the East Asia Regional Council of Overseas Schools (EARCOS).

References

External links

Elementary schools in Japan
International Baccalaureate schools in Japan
International schools in Tokyo
Private schools in Tokyo
Canadian international schools in Japan
Shinagawa